Nova Gajdobra is a village located in the Bačka Palanka municipality, in the South Bačka District of Serbia. It is situated in the Autonomous Province of Vojvodina at 45.20° North, 19.27° East. The population of the village numbering 1,409 people (2002 census), of whom 1,354 are ethnic Serbs.

History 

In 1327 village Kereky ( or Керекић) was established between Palanka and Gajdobra. The next time village was mentioned was in 1512. During the Ottoman rule (16th–17th century), two villages existed at this location: Kerekić (Керекић) and Metković (Метковић). Both villages were populated by ethnic Serbs. Hungarians called them Metkovics and Kerekity, which were modified versions of the Serbian names.

In 1650, Kerekić was uninhabited, but 38 years later Serbs again settled there. Today Kerekić is a name of the farm near Nova Gajdobra. In the 19th century Germans rebuilt it and lived here together with Serbs and Hungarians. It was a part of Habsburg Empire until 1918, when it became part of the Kingdom of Serbs, Croats and Slovenes. In 1922, it officially changed its name to Nova Gajdobra.

Today, people of Nova Gajdobra work in agriculture. Kids go to Primary school Aleksa Šantić, named by famous Serb poet. There are many cultural manifestations in Nova Gajdobra.

Historical population

1961: 1,623
1971: 1,433
1981: 1,331
1991: 1,372

See also 
Bačka Palanka
South Bačka District
Bačka
List of places in Serbia
List of cities, towns and villages in Vojvodina

References
Slobodan Ćurčić, Broj stanovnika Vojvodine, Novi Sad, 1996.

Bačka Palanka
Places in Bačka
South Bačka District